The Nissan Pintara is a compact automobile that was manufactured by Nissan Motor Australia from 1986 until 1992.

First generation (R31; 1986–1990) 

The first generation R31 Nissan Pintara is a compact family car which was built by Nissan Australia at its Clayton, Victoria assembly plant in Melbourne from mid-1986.

Replacing the locally produced Nissan Bluebird (910), it was based on the Nissan Skyline with a single fuel-injected 2.0-litre four-cylinder engine, entirely built and sold in Australia to compete with the Mitsubishi Magna. Like the Australian-built six cylinder R31 Skyline, it was offered in sedan and station wagon form.

Four specification levels of the R31 Pintara were offered: GLi, Executive, GX, and GXE. A TRX bodykit package was offered for the GX and GXE sedans, featuring a front and rear air dam, rear spoiler, side skirts, grille cover, alloy wheels and low profile tyres. 
Unlike the later U12 TRX, this did not feature any mechanical upgrades.

This unit was SOHC, multi-point fuel injected featuring electronic concentrated control system (ECCS) including electronic ignition. It featured two spark plugs per cylinder to help meet emission requirements.

This engine was previously seen in the (sportier) Nissan Gazelle and was a particularly high revving engine for a car of this type.

Rather than build the U11 Bluebird, Nissan Australia had chosen to go the route of building a localised four-cylinder Skyline, because of the Bluebird's switch to front-wheel drive with the U11. Nissan Australia had feared that the new front-wheel drive design would not resonate well with the Australian consumer, as the Australian market was well acclimated to rear-wheel drive at the time.

For this reason, rival Toyota had continued to produce the rear-wheel drive T140 Corona up to 1987 for the Australian market, despite most other markets receiving the front-wheel-drive T150. The reality of marketing a front-wheel drive Bluebird in the Australian market would come into fruition with the succeeding U12 model.

Second generation (U12; 1989–1992) 

The first generation Pintara was replaced in 1989 by a model initially dubbed by the media as "Project Matilda", which turned out to be a locally produced front-wheel drive version of the Nissan Bluebird (U12), rather than a model uniquely designed for Australia as initial stories had indicated.  However, the model performed badly in local testing, and required body and chassis strengthening.

In Australia, this was sold as the Nissan Pintara (U12), also available as a locally designed five-door "Superhatch". The sedan and Superhatch were exported to New Zealand as the Nissan Bluebird (replacing locally assembled models sourced from Japan) while the Superhatch was exported to Japan as the Bluebird Aussie.

The U12 model was discontinued in mid-1992 when Nissan Australia ended local production and New Zealand reverted to local assembly of the next generation Bluebird from Japanese kits.

Under the Button car plan, in which local manufacturers shared models, Ford Australia marketed a rebadged version of the U12 Pintara sedan and hatchback as the Ford Corsair. In addition, Ford provided the tooling and stamped the car's body panels.

Nissan fitted a 2.0-litre CA20E inline-four engine to the GLi and Executive levels of trim.

T, Ti, and TRX versions received a 2.4-litre KA24E inline-four. Fitted with electronic concentrated control system (ECCS) for precise MPI fuel injection, the 2.4-litre also featured ignition timing control with SOHC and three valves per cylinder (two intake, one exhaust).

References

Cars of Australia
Pintara
Cars introduced in 1986
1980s cars
1990s cars
Cars discontinued in 1993